"I Surrender" is a song by the English singer-songwriter David Sylvian. It is the first single from his album Dead Bees on a Cake.

Chart positions

References

1999 singles
David Sylvian songs
Songs written by David Sylvian
1999 songs
Virgin Records singles